This is the list of presidents of Bukovina, the district-governors (until 1849) and the administrators (until 1861).

The years 1849 - 1854 were, according to the declaration of independence of Bukovina, a transitional period, during which the former district office gradually passed over into an independent state government. It was not until 29 May 1854, one can speak of such.  

 Gabriel Baron Splény von Miháldy, General (1774–April 6, 1778)
 Karl Freiherr von Enzenberg, General (April 1778–October 31, 1786)
 Joseph von Beck (1786–1792)
 Basil Freiherr von Balsch (1792–1803)
 Franz von Schreiber (1803–1805)
 Franz Adam Ritter von Mitscha (1805–1807)
 Johann von Platzer (1807–1817)
 Joseph Freiherr von Stutterheim (1817–1823)
 Johann von Melczechen (1823–1833)
 Frantz Kratter (1833–1838)
 Kasimir von Milbacher (1838–1840)
 Gheorghe Isăcescu (1840–1849)
 Eduard Ritter von Bach (February 1849–July 1849)
 Anton Freiherr Henniger von Seeberg (July 1849–March 1, 1853)
 Franz Freiherr von Schmück (From March 6, 1853 provisionally President; May 29, 1854 – November 27, 1857 first independent President)    
 Karl Graf von Rothkirch-Panthen (February 18, 1857–May 1860)
 Jakob Ritter von Mikuli – Chef of the provisionally Government of Bukowina (September 1, 1860 – March 1, 1861)
 Wenzel Ritter von Martina – erster Landespräsident des Herzogtums Bukowina (March 26, 1861 – May 2, 1862)
 Rudolph Graf von Amadei (May 31, 1862 – October 30, 1865)
 Franz Ritter Myrbach von Rheinfeld (October 30, 1865 – October 4, 1870)
 Felix Freiherr Pino von Friedenthal (October 4, 1870 – July 8, 1874)
 Hieronymus Freiherr von Alesani (August 18, 1874 – February 8, 1887)
 Felix Freiherr Pino von Friedenthal (February 1887–August 1, 1890)
 Anton Graf Pace von Friedensberg (first from January 9, 1891 Head of Government, August 1, 1891 – May 17, 1892)
 Franz Freiherr von Krauß (May 22, 1892 – June 13, 1894)
 Leopold Graf von Goëss (November 15, 1894 – December 16, 1897)
 Friedrich Freiherr Bourguignon von Baumberg (December 16, 1897 – February 27, 1903)
 Prinz Konrad zu Hohenlohe-Schillingsfürst (February 28, 1903 – October 1, 1904)
 Oktavian Freiherr Regner von Bleyleben (October 1, 1904 – December 15, 1911)
 Rudolf Graf von Meran (January 1, 1912 – December 31, 1916)
 Josef Graf von Ezdorf (May 1, 1917 – November 5, 1918)
The last president of the Duchy, Joseph Graf von Etzdorf, could practically not perform his duties due to the war. He also had to  change constantly his official residence: Vatra Dornei, then Cluj, Prague, Stanislau and at last Cernăuți.

Gallery

Notes 

History of Bukovina
Politicians of Bukovina